is a ryokan (Japanese traditional inn) founded in 718 in Ishikawa Prefecture, Japan. It has been owned and managed by the Hoshi family for forty-six generations and was thought to be the oldest operating hotel in the world until Nishiyama Onsen Keiunkan, founded in 705, claimed that title.

See also
 Three Ancient Springs
 List of oldest companies

References

External links
Official website in English
Official website in Japanese

Short documentary about Houshi from 2014

Buildings and structures completed in 718
Hotels in Ishikawa Prefecture
Tourist attractions in Ishikawa Prefecture
Henokiens companies
8th-century establishments in Japan
Komatsu, Ishikawa
Companies established in the 8th century
Ryokan